Slager is a Dutch occupational surname meaning "butcher". Notable people with the surname include:

Denzel Slager (born 1993), Dutch football striker
Don Slager (born 1963), American corporate director
Hal Slager (born ?), American (Indiana) Republican politician 
Johan Slager (born 1946), Dutch rock guitarist
Michael Slager (born 1981), American police officer who shot Walter Scott
 (1880–1943), Dutch violinist
 (1841–1912), Dutch painter
Rick Slager (born 1954), American football player

See also
Museum Slager, a museum showing the paintings of Piet Slager Sr. and seven of his descendants

Dutch-language surnames
Occupational surnames